Kandalakbashevo (Qandalaqbaş) is a rural locality (a village) in Taktagulovsky Selsoviet, Bakalinsky District, Bashkortostan, Russia. The population was 67 as of 2010. There are 2 streets.

Geography 
Kandalakbashevo is located 35 km east of Bakaly (the district's administrative centre) by road. Kamayevo is the nearest rural locality.

References 

Rural localities in Bakalinsky District